Robert Anson Jordan Jr. (July 19, 1937 – August 30, 1993) was an American actor. A long-time member of the New York Shakespeare Festival, he performed in many Off Broadway and Broadway plays. His films include Logan's Run, Les Misérables, Old Boyfriends, Raise the Titanic, The Friends of Eddie Coyle, The Yakuza, Interiors, The Bunker, Dune, The Secret of My Success, Timebomb, The Hunt for Red October, Posse and Gettysburg.

Early life
Jordan was born in New York City to Robert Anson Jordan, Sr. from Boston, Massachusetts, and Constance (née Hand) from New York. His maternal grandfather was Learned Hand, judge of the United States Court of Appeals for the Second Circuit, and one of the most highly respected jurists in the United States. In 1942, when Jordan was five years old, his parents divorced. His mother married Newbold Morris, president of the New York City Council. Mayor Fiorello H. La Guardia officiated at the ceremony held in Gracie Mansion, the first marriage performed there.

Career

Jordan attended the Hotchkiss School in Lakeville, Connecticut. Following his graduation from Harvard University in 1958, Jordan began his acting career in earnest.

Jordan told the friends he made early in his career that he took the stage name Richard because he wanted to avoid being confused with another actor named Robert Jordan. He continued to be known as Bob to those friends.

In 1961, Jordan appeared on Broadway with Art Carney and Elizabeth Ashley in Take Her, She's Mine. He also began working in television productions, appearing in episodes of The Defenders, Naked City, Ben Casey, Empire, and The Wide Country. He performed with Joseph Papp's Public Theater in productions of Shakespeare's plays, such as The Tempest, The Merchant of Venice and As You Like It. In 1966, Jordan returned to Broadway, appearing in Generation with Henry Fonda.

Beginning in 1970, Jordan turned from television to feature film work. He co-starred in Lawman (1971) and Valdez Is Coming (1971) with Burt Lancaster, and appeared opposite Robert Mitchum twice: in The Friends of Eddie Coyle (1973), as the informant-Coyle's handler, a pragmatic U.S. Treasury agent; and in The Yakuza (1975) as the bodyguard of Mitchum's friend, George Tanner. He played a host of villains and mixed good guy-villains in films such as the western Rooster Cogburn (1975), sci-fi adventure Logan's Run (1976), and the Woody Allen-directed drama Interiors (1978). There was also the occasional "good guy" as in Old Boyfriends (1979), in which he played the father of his own daughter, Nina.

While his film career developed, Jordan continued performing on the stage, joining Ralph Waite in the L.A. Actors' Theatre. He wrote, directed, and performed in plays such as Venus of Menschen Falls (1978). In 1976, he starred as Joseph Armagh, an Irish immigrant who fights his way to power and wealth but loses his soul along the way, in the television miniseries Captains and the Kings. Jordan earned both a Golden Globe award and an Emmy nomination for the production.

In the 1980s, Jordan performed in a number of feature films, such as Raise the Titanic (1980), Flash of Green (1984), Dune (1984), The Mean Season (1985), and The Secret of My Success (1987). He co-starred in an acclaimed television production of The Bunker (1981), playing Albert Speer to Anthony Hopkins's Adolf Hitler. In 10 episodes of the television series The Equalizer (1987–1988), he played the lead role while series star Edward Woodward recovered from a heart attack.

On stage, Jordan won an Obie award for his appearance in New York in the Czech playwright Václav Havel's A Private View (1983) and an L.A. Drama Critics' Award for directing Largo Desolato (1987), another Havel play. In Romero (1989), Jordan played Romero's friend, Father Rutilio Grande.

In 1990, Jordan directed a production of Macbeth in New York City. He played U.S. National Security Advisor Jeffrey Pelt in The Hunt for Red October. He starred in a television production of Three Hotels (1991) and the 1991 "Deadline" episode of Tales from the Crypt. In Posse (1993), Jordan portrays Bates, a racist sheriff with his own plans for land on which the Negro town of Freemanville stands.
 
Jordan's last film to be released was Gettysburg (1993), filmed during the summer of 1992. He portrayed Brig. Gen. Lewis "Lo" Armistead, one of the Confederate officers who took part in Pickett's Charge at the battle of Gettysburg. Producer-director Ronald F. Maxwell dedicated the film to Jordan and to author Michael Shaara, whose novel The Killer Angels (1974) had been adapted for the film.

Personal life
Jordan's daughter Nina Jordan was born in 1964 during his 1964–1972 marriage to actress Kathleen Widdoes. His son Robert Anson Jordan III was born in 1982 during his nine-year relationship with actress Blair Brown. At the time of his death, Jordan was in a relationship with actress Marcia Cross.

Death
By 1993, his health began to fail and he was diagnosed with brain cancer. Cast as Dr. Charles Nichols, he was filming The Fugitive in April 1993 when his illness forced him to withdraw. He was replaced by Jeroen Krabbé. He died on August 30, 1993, at the age of 56, cared for by his daughter Nina and his companion, Marcia Cross.

A memorial in Jordan's honor was held at the Mark Taper Forum in Los Angeles on October 8, 1993, the day Gettysburg was released.

Filmography

References

External links

 
 Richard Jordan(Aveleyman)

1937 births
1993 deaths
Male actors from New York City
American male film actors
American male stage actors
American male television actors
Deaths from cancer in California
Neurological disease deaths in California
Deaths from brain cancer in the United States
Hotchkiss School alumni
Harvard University alumni
Obie Award recipients
Best Drama Actor Golden Globe (television) winners
20th-century American male actors
Male Western (genre) film actors